H. robustus  may refer to:
 Heilprinia robustus, a sea snail species
 Hippoglossoides robustus, the Bering flounder, a flatfish species native to the northern Pacific
 Hyperolius robustus, a frog species endemic to Democratic Republic of the Congo

See also
 Robustus (disambiguation)